Enrique Leite (born December 12, 1963 at Villa del Cerro, Montevideo, Uruguay is an Uruguayan sprint canoeist who competed in the early 1990s. At the 1992 Summer Olympics in Barcelona, he was eliminated in the repechages of both the K-1 500 m and the K-1 1000 m events.

In 1979 he was bronze medal in the South American Swimming Championship in São Paulo, Brazil.
In 1980 was named to be a member of the Uruguayan national swimming team for the Moscow Olympics but finally Uruguay adhered to the Boycott and did not participate in those games.
Participated as a swimmer for the Uruguay national team at the Pan-American Games in Puerto Rico (1979)

As a Uruguayan Team swimmer participated in South American Games in Buenos Aires 1980, Medellìn 1981 (silver in the 400m individual medley and 200m breaststroke, and bronze in the 200m individual medley among other Uruguay relays medals.
For the 1982 South American Swimming Championship in La Paz, Bolivia he became the first in history Uruguayan swimmer (male) in obtaining a gold medal for Uruguay Swimming in the major category. In the same championship was gold for the 400m individual medley and 200m breaststroke and silver for 200m individual medley with a final count of seven medals including the Uruguayan team relays.
Participated in the 1982 Swimming World Championship in Guayaquil, Ecuador.

In 1982 was a member of the Uruguayan National Swimming team for the South American Games in Rosario, Argentina where was Gold for the 400m individual medley and 200m breaststroke among other medals obtained individually and as a member of the Uruguay relays team.
In 1983 was member of the Uruguayan Swimming National team for the Pan-American Games in Caracas, Venezuela.
In 1984 South American Swimming Championship in Rio, Brazil was bronze for the 400m individual medley.
In 1986 was a Water Polo player for the Uruguay National Team at the South American Water Polo Championship in Santiago, Chile.
In 1988 while studying Physical education, started practicing flat water kayaking on his brother's recommendation.
As a paddler, was part of the Uruguayan National Canoeing team for the World Canoeing Championship in Poznan, Poland 1990 and Paris 1991 as well as for the Pre-Olympics at Barcelona in 1991.
In 1991 was a member of the Uruguayan National Canoeing Team for the Pan American Games in La Habana, Cuba where he placed fifth for the K1-1000m, which qualified him to be in the 1992 Olympics in Barcelona.

Enrique Leite is the ONLY athlete in Uruguay in making the National Team for Pan-American Games or Olympics in two different sport disciplines, Swimming and Canoeing.

As a Swimming Coach he had taken the Carrasco Lawn Tennis Club Summer Swimming team to the First place in 1984.
In 2008 and 2009 Optimist South American Championships held in Paracas- Perú and Salinas- Ecuador he was the Team Leader of the Uruguayan National Optimist Team

References
Sports-Reference.com profile

1963 births
Swimmers at the 1979 Pan American Games
Swimmers at the 1983 Pan American Games
Canoeists at the 1992 Summer Olympics
Living people
Uruguayan male swimmers
Pan American Games competitors for Uruguay
Olympic canoeists of Uruguay
Uruguayan male canoeists
20th-century Uruguayan people
21st-century Uruguayan people